Xoʻjaobod is a tuman (district) of Andijan Region in Uzbekistan. The capital lies at the city Xoʻjaobod.

The district consists of 1 city (Xoʻjaobod), 5 urban-type settlements (Guliston, Dilkushod, Koʻtarma, Manak and Xidirsha) and 4 rural communities.

References

Districts of Uzbekistan
Andijan Region